Jean Jourlin (1 December 1904 – 2 October 1979) was a French wrestler. He competed at the 1928 Summer Olympics and the 1936 Summer Olympics.

References

External links
 

1904 births
1979 deaths
French male sport wrestlers
Olympic wrestlers of France
Wrestlers at the 1928 Summer Olympics
Wrestlers at the 1936 Summer Olympics
People from Tarare
Sportspeople from Rhône (department)
20th-century French people